Marly-la-Ville is a commune in the Val-d'Oise department in Île-de-France in northern France, 25 km north of Paris.

History
Thomas-François Dalibard lived at 15 rue du Colonel Fabien, a classical eighteenth-century mansion. He was a naturalist and a disciple of Georges-Louis Leclerc de Buffon. He translated and published the works of Carl Linnaeus thus introducing Linnaean nomenclature in France. Also a devoted physicist, he tested the experimental ideas of Benjamin Franklin at his house, completing the first capture electrical charge from lightning. Thus, the lightning rod was born at Marly-la-Ville.

Population

See also
Communes of the Val-d'Oise department

References

External links
Official website 

Association of Mayors of the Val d'Oise 

Communes of Val-d'Oise